Ibrahim Sultan Polytechnic (PIS) is a polytechnics in Pasir Gudang, Johor, Malaysia (the ninth institution established).<ref>{{cite web|url=http://www.politeknik.edu.my/portalbpp/index.asp?pg=poli|title=Portal Rasmi Bahagian Pengambilan Pelajar Politeknik 

The polytechnic specialises in technical studies, with separate departments for the engineering divisions such as mechanical and electrical engineering. It also has departments for design and visual communications, tourism and hospitality, mathematics, science and computer, and general studies.

History
Planning for the polytechnic began in the 7th Malaysian Plan in collaboration with the government of Malaysia and the World Bank. Politeknik Ibrahim Sultan opened its doors to students in July 1998 in Johor Bahru Technical Secondary School (also known in Malay as Sekolah Menengah Teknik Johor Bahru. Planning early establishment of Politeknik Ibrahim Sultan began in 1991, with an effort to identify a suitable site in the area of Johor Bahru. In July 1998, Politeknik Ibrahim Sultan began operating in the actual site of 100 acres in Plentong, Johor Bahru, with a project cost of RM 155.52 million.

Vision
 To be a leader of Technical & Vocational Education and Training (TVET) in Asia Pacific by 2020.

Mission
 Develop at least three year internationally active collaboration.
 Become a Centre of Excellence for Technical & Vocational Education and Training (TVET) in Asia Pacific.
 Gaining international recognition at the institutional level, staff and students.
 Increasing the employability of graduates to 100 per cent in the global market.

General

Rebranding
The original name of this public higher education institution before Politeknik Ibrahim Sultan (PIS) was Politeknik Johor Bahru (PJB). Politeknik Johor Bahru changed its name to Politeknik Ibrahim Sultan after the name of Sultan of Johor (in Malay word as Sultan Dan Yang Dipertuan Bagi Negeri Dan Jajahan Takluk Johor Darul Ta'zim). The name change officially took place on 15 December 2011. Council Declaration Politeknik Ibrahim Sultan was executed by His Majesty the Sultan Ibrahim Ismail ibni al-Marhum Sultan Mahmud Iskandar, son of the late Sultan Iskandar of Johor at the Multipurpose Hall of Politeknik Ibrahim Sultan (now known as Dewan Tunku Laksamana Abdul Jalil).

Recognition

Politeknik Ibrahim Sultan has been recognised as one of three Premier Polytechnics by the Ministry of Higher Education Malaysia on 25 February 2010 at the Putrajaya International Convention Centre (PICC), which was officiated by Deputy Prime Minister of Malaysia Tan Sri Muhyiddin Yassin. Two other polytechnics is also recognised are Politeknik Ungku Omar (PUO) and Politeknik Sultan Salahuddin Abdul Aziz Shah (PSA).

Malaysia Polytechnic University

Recognition as Premier Polytechnic is fundamental before Malaysia Polytechnic University was established in 2015.

Premier Polytechnic

THREE polytechnic recognised as the premier polytechnic which is Politeknik Ibrahim Sultan (PIS), Politeknik Ungku Omar (PUO), and Politeknik Sultan Salahuddin Abdul Aziz Shah (PSA) are given autonomy to modify the 30 percent of the learning modules, particularly in the subject (niche area) determined in each direction.

Academic

Courses of Study
Politeknik Ibrahim Sultan offers several courses in the Special Skills Certificate, Diploma, Advanced Diploma, and (estimated to be offering degree programs "Hands-On" at the latest by the year 2013 and other post-graduate program at the time coming soon).

International Accreditation

Canadian Technology Accreditation Board
In 2014, all polytechnics in Malaysia has received accreditation from the Canadian Technology Accreditation Board.
The courses that has been accredited are: -
 Diploma in Civil Engineering
 Diploma in Mechanical Engineering (eligible to students of Politeknik Ibrahim Sultan)
 Diploma in Electrical Engineering
 Diploma in Mechatronic Engineering (eligible to students of Politeknik Ibrahim Sultan)
 Diploma in Mechanical Engineering (Manufacturing) (eligible to students of Politeknik Ibrahim Sultan)
 Diploma in Electronic Engineering (Computer)
 Diploma in Electrical & Electronic Engineering (eligible to students of Politeknik Ibrahim Sultan)

All above programmes equivalent to Technician Level (Dublin) based on IQDB Rating.

Collaboration & Articulation
To provide continuous routes, Politeknik Ibrahim Sultan will create articulation with John Moores University and implement twinning programs with Taylor's University for Hospitality program articulated by Toulouse University in France (in preparation for creating a course leading to a bachelor's degree in Hotel & Catering Management soon which is expected in 2013 - 2015).

Credit Exemption
University of Southern Queensland (USQ), Australia has been offering bachelor's degree programs for engineering and engineering technology programs for Malaysian Polytechnics Diploma holder. Exemption of credit of up to 10 academic courses and practical courses for polytechnic diploma awarded depending on the articulation route for a bachelor's degree program at USQ.

Here is a list of polytechnic diploma program credit exemption for bachelor's degree programs offered at USQ;
 Diploma in Electronics Engineering (Control) - (eligible to students of Politeknik Ibrahim Sultan)
 Diploma in Electronic Engineering (Computer)
 Diploma in Mechanical Engineering - (eligible to students of Politeknik Ibrahim Sultan)
 Diploma in Mechanical Engineering (Plastics)
 Diploma in Mechanical Engineering (Materials) - (eligible to students of Politeknik Ibrahim Sultan)
 Diploma in Mechanical Engineering (Packaging)
 Diploma in Civil Engineering
 Diploma in Environmental Engineering
 Diploma in Land Surveying
 Diploma in Quantity Surveying

USQ Program relevant to the polytechnic diploma and total exemption granted may be referred to in a letter from the USQ dated 3 March 2012 for more information.

Department & Programme

International Students
Recently, international students also have the opportunity to study at the Politeknik Ibrahim Sultan (at the latest by the year 2015).

Niche area
The main areas offered by the Politeknik Ibrahim Sultan is in Engineering (Mechanical & Electrical), Hotel & Catering Management, Fashion Design, Tourism Management and Design (Graphics & Industry).

Mode Of Study
Politeknik Ibrahim Sultan offered full-time and part-time program mode.

Centre of Excellence

Poly Boutique
Poly Boutique is a brand developed by Malaysia Polytechnic Entrepreneurship Centre or better known as the abbreviation for MPEC. The first incubator of Poly Boutique is located at the Politeknik Ibrahim Sultan. It was undertaken jointly between fashion & apparel design students and entrepreneurship club. The brand was launched by Linda Onn.

Poly Cuisine
Poly Cuisine or formerly known as Dapur Kampus ... Bersama Poly Cuisine is a television show (culinary travelog) produced by Department of Polytechnic Education in collaboration with KiraWang Sdn. Bhd. that highlights polytechnic graduate capability and capacity in terms of skills, innovation and entrepreneurship.

5 polytechnics which offer courses in Hotel and Catering department has been involved in the success of this plan includes Politeknik Ibrahim Sultan, Pasir Gudang, Johor, Politeknik Tuanku Syed Sirajuddin, Arau, Perlis, Politeknik Sultan Idris Shah, Sabak Bernam, Selangor, Politeknik Merlimau, Melaka and Politeknik Kota Kinabalu Sabah.

Through this plan, the polytechnic graduates can demonstrate prowess and skills in preparation of special recipes specifically local tradition.

Starting 6 January 2013, Karl Shafek will make a special appearance as the host. This plan will be aired every Sunday at 12.30 pm on RTM 1.

Poly Agro
Politeknik Ibrahim Sultan (PIS) has developed plantation chilli fertigation with its own brand of Poly Agro in Kulai.

Poly Travel

Poly Design

Residential Colleges

Campus Residential College
 Kolej Hi-Tech 1 (HT1)  
 Kolej Hi-Tech 2 (HT2)
 Kolej Hi-Tech 3 (HT3)
 Kolej Info Tech 1 (IF1)
 Kolej Info Tech 2 (IF2)
 Kuartes (for staff)
 Kolej Hi-10

Off-Campus Residential College
Known as a "Smart Home". The address is Flat Taman Cendana, Pasir Gudang, Johor. It is a partnership developed by Marbleplan Property Sdn Bhd. and supported by the Ministry of Higher Education Malaysia.
 Block 2
 Block 3
 Block 4

Cooperation
Recently, a memorandum of understanding was signed between the Department of Polytechnic and Community College Management (JPPKK) with four local universities to establish the Malaysian Technical University Network Programme (MTUN). The university is Universiti Tun Hussein Onn Malaysia (UTHM), Universiti Teknikal Malaysia Melaka (UTeM), Universiti Malaysia Pahang (UMP) and Universiti Malaysia Perlis (UniMAP).

Through this program, the university will allocate slots by 20 percent to polytechnic graduate students. Apart from that, the transfer of credit for polytechnic students will also be more simplified. This will provide opportunities for students to choose more variety of relevant courses.

Ratings

MQA PolyRate 2013
Politeknik Ibrahim Sultan was evaluated and given a rating in PolyRate 2013 and classified as Tier 6 which is Outstanding polytechnics in Malaysia.

This makes Politeknik Ibrahim Sultan as one of the best three of the 32 polytechnics in Malaysia until now.

Achievement

Social Responsibility
Politeknik Ibrahim Sultan social obligation to offer courses to people with disabilities (or in Malaysia formerly known as Orang Kelainan Upaya and OKU in acronym) to give them the opportunity to receive training appropriate to their ability. This supported a conducive learning environment complete with high-tech workshops, computer labs, resource centre and wireless internet access make the climate more transformative learning, creative and innovative. In addition, the lecturers become an important asset in the form of students who are knowledgeable, skilled and competitive.

References

External links

 Official Portal of Politeknik Ibrahim Sultan

Pasir Gudang
Universities and colleges in Johor
Engineering universities and colleges in Malaysia
Art schools in Malaysia
Educational institutions established in 1998
1998 establishments in Malaysia
Polytechnics in Malaysia
Technical universities and colleges in Malaysia